Oteh is a Nigerian surname. Notable people with the surname include:

 Aramide Oteh (born 1998), English football player
 Arunma Oteh, Nigerian politician

Surnames of Nigerian origin